The 1970 Algerian Cup Final was the 7th final of the Algerian Cup. The final took place on June 28, 1970, at Stade communal de Bologhine in Bologhine with kick-off at 15:00. CR Belcourt beat USM Alger 4-1 to win their third Algerian Cup.

Pre-match

Details

Replay

References

Cup
Algeria
Algerian Cup Finals
USM Alger matches